The 1995 Mississippi State Bulldogs football team represented Mississippi State University during the 1995 NCAA Division I-A football season. The team's head coach was Jackie Sherrill. The Bulldogs played their home games in 1995 at Scott Field in Starkville, Mississippi.

Schedule

References

Mississippi State
Mississippi State Bulldogs football seasons
Mississippi State Bulldogs football